Michael Grundy (born 1 March 1987) is an English professional mixed martial artist and retired freestyle wrestler who also competed in the Featherweight division of the Ultimate Fighting Championship (UFC). During his wrestling career, Grundy most notably claimed a bronze medal from the 2014 Commonwealth Games.

Background
Grundy started wrestling at a young age under the guidance of his father. He has four siblings who all have wrestled to some extent.

Freestyle wrestling career
During his wrestling career, Grundy represented both England and Great Britain. He made two Junior World Teams and one Senior World Team while wrestling for England. Grundy wrestled for Great Britain in the men's freestyle 74 kg division at the 2009 World Wrestling Championships, where he went 1–1. Competing for England, he competed in the men's freestyle 74 kg event at the 2010 Commonwealth Games, where he finished 5th overall. In his last international wrestling event, Grundy also competed for England in the men's freestyle 74 kg event at the 2014 Commonwealth Games where he won a bronze medal, being the best achievement of his career.

Mixed martial arts career

Early career
His initial contact with mixed martial arts was when he helped Terry Etim during his fight camp in 2007. Gradually he picked up various disciplines and ultimately made his amateur mixed martial arts debut in 2011, followed by professional debut in September 2014. Over the next three years, Grundy competed for various promotions including Shooto, BAMMA, and Absolute Championship Berkut. He amassed a record of 11 wins against 1 loss before joining the UFC.

Ultimate Fighting Championship
Grundy made his debut on 16 March 2019  at UFC Fight Night: Till vs. Masvidal against Nad Narimani. He won the fight via technical knockout in the second round.

Grundy was scheduled to face Movsar Evloev on 31 August 2019 at UFC on ESPN+ 15.  However, on 19 August it was reported that Grundy had pulled out from the event, citing injury.

Grundy was scheduled to face Makwan Amirkhani on 21 March 2020 at UFC Fight Night: Woodley vs. Edwards. However, the event was eventually postponed due to the COVID-19 pandemic.

Grundy faced Movsar Evloev on 26 July 2020 at UFC on ESPN 14. He lost the fight via unanimous decision.

Grundy was expected to face Nik Lentz on 16 January 2021 at UFC on ABC 1. However, a member of Grundy's team tested positive for COVID-19, hence Grundy was pulled from the fight.

Grundy faced Lando Vannata at UFC 262 on May 15, 2021. He lost the fight via split decision.

As the last fight of his prevailing contract, Grundy faced Makwan Amirkhani at UFC Fight Night 204 on March 19, 2022. The bout was originally scheduled to occur at UFC Fight Night: Woodley vs. Edwards. Grundy lost the fight via technical submission with an Anaconda choke in the first round.

In May 2022, it was reported that Grundy was released by UFC.

Personal life
Grundy has three sons, of whom the oldest is also a mixed martial artist.

Championships and accomplishments

Freestyle wrestling

Senior 
 United World Wrestling (FILA)
 2014 Commonwealth Games - Bronze Medal - 74 kg
 2011 Grand Prix of Spain - 9th place - 74 kg
 2010 Commonwealth Games - 5th place - 74 kg
 2010 Great Britain Cup - 7th place - 74 kg
 2010 European Championship - 16th place - 74 kg
 2009 World Championship - 12th place - 74 kg
 2009 European Championship - 23rd place - 74 kg
 2008 2nd Olympic Qualification - 20th place - 74 kg
 2008 1st Olympic Qualification - 29th place - 74 kg
 2007 European Championship - 22nd place - 74 kg

Mixed martial arts 
Aspera Fighting Championship
 Aspera FC Featherweight Championship (One time)

Brazilian Jiu-jitsu 
IBJJF European No-Gi Championships
2015 European Championship First placer (lightweight, blue belt)

Mixed martial arts record

|-
|Loss
|align=center|12–4
|Makwan Amirkhani
|Technical Submission (anaconda choke)
|UFC Fight Night: Volkov vs. Aspinall
|
|align=center|1
|align=center|0:57
|London, England
|
|-
|Loss
|align=center|12–3
|Lando Vannata
|Decision (split)
|UFC 262
|
|align=center|3
|align=center|5:00
|Houston, Texas, United States
|
|-
|Loss
|align=center|12–2
|Movsar Evloev
|Decision (unanimous)
|UFC on ESPN: Whittaker vs. Till 
|
|align=center|3
|align=center|5:00
|Abu Dhabi, United Arab Emirates
|  
|-
|Win
|align=center|12–1
|Nad Narimani
|TKO (punches)
|UFC Fight Night: Till vs. Masvidal 
|
|align=center|2
|align=center|4:42
|London, England
|
|-
| Win
| align=center|11–1
| Fernando Bruno
| Decision (unanimous)
| Aspera FC 58
| 
| align=center| 3
| align=center| 5:00
| Gaspar, Brazil
|
|-
| Win
| align=center| 10–1
| Michael Tobin
| Submission (guillotine choke)
| ACB 65: Silva vs. Agnaev
| 
| align=center| 3
| align=center| 4:38
| Sheffield, England
|  
|-
| Win
| align=center| 9–1
| Yutaka Saito
| Decision (unanimous)	
| Professional Shooto 1/29
| 
| align=center| 3
| align=center| 5:00
| Tokyo, Japan
| 
|-
| Win
| align=center| 8–1
| Fouad Mesdari
| Submission (arm-triangle choke)
| Shinobi War 9
| 
| align=center| 1
| align=center| 2:39
| Liverpool, England
| 
|-
| Win
| align=center| 7–1
| Daniel Vasquez
| Submission (arm-triangle choke)
| ICE Fighting Championships 18
| 
| align=center| 1
| align=center| 1:15
| Manchester, England
| 
|-
| Win
| align=center| 6–1
| Zsolt Fényes
| Submission (americana)
| ICE Fighting Championships 17
| 
| align=center| 1
| align=center| 0:55
| Manchester, England
| 
|-
| Win
| align=center| 5–1
| Marley Swindells
| Decision (unanimous)
| BAMMA 25
| 
| align=center| 3
| align=center| 5:00
| Birmingham, England
|
|-
| Win
| align=center| 4–1
| Damian Frankiewicz
| Submission (arm-triangle choke)
| BAMMA 21
| 
| align=center| 1
| align=center| 3:59
| Birmingham, England
|
|-
| Loss
| align=center| 3–1
| Damian Stasiak
| Submission (triangle choke)
| BAMMA 19
| 
| align=center| 2
| align=center| 4:18
| Blackpool, England
| 
|-
| Win
| align=center| 3–0
| Mamadou Gueye
| Submission (Brabo choke)
| BAMMA 18
| 
| align=center| 1
| align=center| 3:35
| Wolverhampton, England
| 
|-
| Win
| align=center| 2–0
| Mike Cutting
| Submission (Brabo choke)
| BAMMA 17
| 
| align=center| 1
| align=center| 1:56
| Manchester, England
| 
|-
| Win
| align=center| 1–0
| Ant Phillips
| Submission (Brabo choke)
| BAMMA 16
| 
| align=center| 1
| align=center| 2:47
| Manchester, England
|
|-

See also
 List of male mixed martial artists

References

External links 
 
 

1987 births
Living people
Sportspeople from Wigan
British male sport wrestlers
Commonwealth Games bronze medallists for England
Wrestlers at the 2014 Commonwealth Games
Commonwealth Games medallists in wrestling
Featherweight mixed martial artists
Mixed martial artists utilizing boxing
Mixed martial artists utilizing freestyle wrestling
Mixed martial artists utilizing Brazilian jiu-jitsu
English male mixed martial artists
English practitioners of Brazilian jiu-jitsu
Ultimate Fighting Championship male fighters
Medallists at the 2014 Commonwealth Games